A referendum on the citizenship law was held in San Marino on 25 July 1982. The proposed abolition of the law failed, with 57.3% voting against it.

Question

Results

References

1982 referendums
Referendums in San Marino
1982 in San Marino
July 1982 events in Europe